The women's 80 metres hurdles event at the 1954 British Empire and Commonwealth Games was held on 6 July at the Empire Stadium in Vancouver, Canada.

Medalists

Results

Heats
Qualification: First 3 in each heat (Q) qualify directly for the final.

Final
Wind: +4.5 m/s

References

Athletics at the 1954 British Empire and Commonwealth Games
1954